Abar Boshonto is a 2019 Bangladeshi film. The film written and directed by Anonno Mamun and produced by Tam Multimedia. It feature Tariq Anam Khan and Orchita Sporshia in the lead roles and Monira Mithu, Ananda Khaled, Mukit Jakariya and Imtu Ratish played supporting roles in the film. The film released on 5 June 2019. For the film Tariq Anam Khan won his second National Film Award for Best Actor.

Cast
 Tariq Anam Khan as Imran Chowdhury
 Orchita Sporshia as Tithi Mostofa
 Imtu Ratish as Imran Chowdhury's son
 Monira Mithu as Imran Chowdhury's daughter
 Mukit Zakaria as Tushar
 Kobori Mizan as Tithi's mother
 Anando Khaled as Imran Chowdhury's private assistance
 Nusrat Jahan Papiya as Imran Chowdhury's grandchildren

Music

Awards
 National Film Award for Best Actor - Tariq Anam Khan (won)

References

Bengali-language Bangladeshi films
2010s Bengali-language films
2019 films
Bangladeshi drama films
Films directed by Anonno Mamun
2019 drama films